Western Punjab may refer to:

 Punjab, Pakistan, mostly used in contexts where Eastern Punjab refers to Punjab of India
 West Punjab, a former province of the dominion of Pakistan
 The western geographic region of Greater Punjab excluding the Lahore region (Central Punjab)

See also
 Western Punjabi (disambiguation)